The Gawad sa Kaunlaran is awarded by the Chief of Staff of the Armed Forces of the Philippines, Area Command, and Major Service Commanders to Philippine citizens.  It is the second highest distinction presented by the Armed Forces of the Philippines to civilians and government officials.

Criteria 
It is awarded for "...conspicuously meritorious and valuable achievement in the pursuit of socio-economic and other non-combat activities, or for conspicuously exceptional~ service which contributed immensely in accomplishing the peaceful objectives of the AFP, or in improving the quality of life of the people within the military establishment."

The medal is awarded without regard to position or length of service for which the recipient is recognized.  Completion of tasks or enterprises are not to be considered, but the conspicuous nature of the achievement is deemed to be itself noteworthy, and deserving of recognition.

Appearance 
The medal is of circular design with 11 silver rays, between the arms of the rays is dark blue.  In the center of the rays is a gold star.  Superimposed diagonally on the star is a single branch of laurel leaves in light—green.

The medal is suspended from a blue ribbon with a yellow-edged central green stripe.

Notable recipients 
 Jovito Palparan
 Ariston Delos Reyes
 Angelo Reyes
 Jaime Zobel de Ayala
 Mahar Lagmay

See also 
 Awards and decorations of the Armed Forces of the Philippines

References

Citations

Bibliography 
 The AFP Adjutant General, AFP Awards and Decorations Handbook, 1995, 1997, OTAG.

 
Orders, decorations, and medals of the Philippines
Military awards and decorations of the Philippines